Club Deportivo Real Tomayapo, best known as Real Tomayapo, is a Bolivian football club based in Tarija. Founded in 1999, it plays in the Bolivian División Profesional after being promoted for the 2021 season by winning the Copa Simón Bolívar the previous season.

History
The club was founded on 2 February 1999, representing the Eustaquio Méndez Province of the Bolivian department of Tarija. It is named after a village located 50 kilometres away from the city of Tarija and known for its peach production. The club was entered into an amateur local league shortly after its foundation.

Having started in the amateur Liga Gremial Obrera, Real Tomayapo managed to make its way to the second tier of the regional league (Primera B), finishing in fourth place with 21 points in 14 matches in its first participation in 2013. The club eventually earned promotion to the Primera A at the end of the 2014–15 season, beating Independiente de Tarija in a double-legged play-off.

In its first years in Primera A, Real Tomayapo established itself as a mid-table club until the 2019 season, when they won their first title in the competition, beating Avilés Industrial on the last matchday to claim the 2019 Apertura championship. The title in the Primera A of the Tarija Football Association (ATF) qualified the club for the 2019 Copa Simón Bolívar, Bolivia's second-tier competition, in which they made it to the semi-finals where they were defeated by Real Santa Cruz.

Parallel to their participation in the Copa Simón Bolívar, Real Tomayapo also played the 2019 Clausura tournament of the ATF Primera A, in which they ended as runners-up behind Atlético Bermejo and qualified for the 2020 Copa Simón Bolívar. In the first stage of that competition, the club topped a group containing fellow Tarija representatives Atlético Bermejo, García Agreda, and Quebracho, beating Bermejo twice, drawing twice against García Agreda and winning one match and losing the remaining one against Quebracho. In the second round, Real Tomayapo faced the runners-up from Chuquisaca, Fancesa, whom they beat on penalty kicks but nevertheless also advanced as lucky loser. The club knocked out EM Huanuni and Cochabamba F.C. in subsequent rounds before facing Fancesa again in the semi-finals. The first leg, played in Sucre ended with Fancesa winning 3–1 and needing only a draw in the second leg in Tarija in order to advance to the final and clinch promotion to the División Profesional. Real Tomayapo managed to win the rematch by a 2–1 score with a late goal and push the definition to a penalty shoot-out, which they won by a 5–3 score in order to secure their first promotion to the top flight of Bolivian football as well as qualification for the final. In the final, Real Tomayapo faced Independiente Petrolero, who had also clinched promotion after beating Vaca Díez in the other semi-final tie. After Independiente won the first leg in Tarija, Real Tomayapo had to win the second leg in Sucre in order to force a penalty shoot-out to decide the title. Real were able to win the rematch with another late goal, and with the ensuing shoot-out ending 4–3 for the side from Tarija, they became the champions of the Copa Simón Bolívar.

Current squad

Honours

Domestic
Copa Simón Bolívar:
Winners (1): 2020

ATF Primera A:
Winners (1): 2019-A
Runners-up (1): 2019-C

References

External links
 Real Tomayapo at Soccerway

Football clubs in Bolivia
Association football clubs established in 1999
1999 establishments in Bolivia